The Parliament of Ivory Coast is the legislature of Ivory Coast. From 1960 to 2016, it was a unicameral body. It became a bicameral body after a new constitution was approved by referendum on October 30, 2016. The parliament consists of two chambers:

The Senate (upper chamber)
The National Assembly (lower chamber)

See also
Politics of Ivory Coast
List of legislatures by country
Legislative branch

References

Politics of Ivory Coast
Political organizations based in Ivory Coast
Ivory Coast
Ivory Coast
Ivory Coast